The Trabzon Tramway is a planned light rail transit system located in Trabzon, Turkey. When completed, the Trabzon Tramway will have 18 stations and run east–west from the city center to the western suburbs of Trabzon and Şenol Güneş Sports Complex the home of Trabzonspor. A final route and financing for the project was announced by Trabzon Mayor Murat Zorluoğlu on February 10, 2022. The line will run  and is expected to carry 57,000 passengers daily when operational.

History
In March 2019, Recep Tayyip Erdoğan announced that a light rail system will be built in Trabzon in an effort to relief traffic congestion and reflective of Trabzon's position as one of the largest cities in Turkey. Following the announcement 3 years of planning and data collection were undertaken by the Trabzon Metropolitan Municipality and the Ministry of Transport and Infrastructure (Turkey). Data collection, route designation and design were completed in early 2022 as announced by the Mayor of Trabzon. The project is expected to cost 140 million Euros.

A date of construction start and estimated construction completion has not been announced. Additional phases of the Tram have been conceptualized but not fully planned.

Stations
Phase One of the project includes 18 stations. All stations will offer safe and clearly identified at-grade pedestrian crossings. The light rail system will run at-grade and at times above-grade.

References

Trabzon
Tram transport in Turkey
Trabzon